Tatiana "Tanya" Dyagileva (born 4 June 1991) is a Belarusian supermodel, artist, art director, fashion designer, stylist, and fashion photographer.

Biography
Tanya D. was born in 1991 in Vitebsk, Belarus. Currently, she lives and works in Europe. Tanya or Tatiana finished BA degree in fashion design at the Istituto Marangoni, a private Italian school for fashion and design. She has also completed the "Fashion Image and Style" year program and "Fashion Business Intensive" program.Also she attended Central Saint Martins, the University of Arts and design in London.

Career

Runway
Shortly after being discovered at the age of 11 (in 2002), Dziahileva signed with the IMG agency in 2004. She was discovered by Tigran Khachatrian of Noah Models, who sent her to St Petersburg to meet IMG Model scouts Jeni Rose and David Cunningham. Tanya D debuted in September 2005, during the Paris Fashion Week and Milan Fashion Week, landing an exclusive with Prada in Milan and booking top shows in Paris including Alexander McQueen, Chanel, and Chloé.

Shortly after, Diagileva was announced as one of the season's most wanted models. She was selected as one of the top newcomers of the season by models.com. During the spring 2008 season, she walked in 74 fashion shows opening the Versace show and closing four shows including Phillip Lim, Celine, and Valentino. In September 2008, Dziahileva was featured in Women's Wear Daily (WWD) as an up-and-coming model to become a supermodel. Also known as Tanya D, she was named one of the most popular top models by Fashion TV. In 2007, she participated in nearly 150 fashion shows across the globe. Since her first major season (spring 2006), Dziahileva has walked the runway in ready-to-wear fashion shows and graced on the haute-couture catwalks for numerous world's top designers, including Chanel, Oscar de la Renta, Dior, Hermès, Alexander McQueen, Jean Paul Gaultier, Missoni, Versace, Prada, Donna Karan, and Calvin Klein.

Fashion Magazine Covers and Editorials

Dziahileva has appeared on the covers of Russian, Japanese, and Latin American Vogue, Russian and Spanish Harper's Bazaar, Korean and Swedish Elle, Japanese and Korean Numéro, Ukrainian L'Officiel, French Revue de Modes, Flair, Deutsch, and Tank. In September 2008, Vogue Russia featured Dziahileva as a top model. She has featured in editorials for V, Numéro, i-D, Deutsch, Tank, Dansk, Harper's Bazaar, and American, Spanish, Chinese, Italian, German, British, Latin American, and Japanese Vogue magazines.

Ad Campaigns

In spring 2006, Dziahileva and Agyness Deyn have featured in a campaign for Hugo by Hugo Boss that proved to be one of the brand's most popular campaigns. Later, Dziahileva landed a major solo campaign when she became the face of Yves Saint Laurent, photographed by Jürgen Teller. Following the two successful campaigns, she became the face for the fashion house of Jean-Paul Gaultier. In 2007, Steven Meisel photographed Dziahileva for the campaign for Lanvin, and the next year Patrick Demarchelier photographed her for the BCBG Max Azria ad campaign. She has also landed many campaigns for brands such as Lacoste, Michael Kors, Christian Dior, DSquared², Hussein Chalayan, Celine, Nina Ricci, Escada Sport, Mango, Ralph Lauren, and Calvin Klein.

References

External links

Tanya Dziahileva Tanya Diagileva on Instagram.

style.com - Photos on style.com
Tanya Dziahileva: Models.com 
Tanya Dziahileva: Supermodels.nl

1991 births
Living people
People from Vitebsk
Belarusian female models